Tim Riener is a former political candidate in Wisconsin.

Biography
Riener was born on December 16, 1960. He was raised in Milwaukee, Wisconsin and later attended the University of Wisconsin–Milwaukee and Marquette University. Riener went on to serve in the United States Marine Corps and the Wisconsin Air National Guard.

On July 10, 1982, Riener married Doris Spangler. They have three children and reside in Oak Creek, Wisconsin.

Political career
Riener was candidate for the United States House of Representatives from Wisconsin's 4th congressional district in 2000. He lost to incumbent Jerry Kleczka. Previously, Riener had defeated Roman R. Blenski in the Republican primary for the seat.

References

Politicians from Milwaukee
Wisconsin Republicans
Candidates in the 2000 United States elections
20th-century American politicians
Military personnel from Milwaukee
United States Marines
United States Air Force airmen
University of Wisconsin–Milwaukee alumni
Marquette University alumni
1960 births
Living people
People from Oak Creek, Wisconsin